This is a list of prime ministers of Spain by time in office. The basis of the list is the inclusive number of days from being sworn in until leaving office.

Of the 102 prime ministers, only four served more than 10 years while sixty-six have served less than a year.

Francisco Franco, who also served as the Head of State until his death, is the only person to have served in the post of prime minister for more than two decades, ruling for a total of 35 years that were preceded by the coup of 1936 and the Spanish Civil War.

Ordered by tenure

See also
 List of prime ministers of Spain
 Prime Minister of Spain
 List of Spanish monarchs
 List of heads of state of Spain
 President of the Republic (Spain)
 List of Spanish regents

External links
 

Spain
Prime Ministers of Spain
Government of Spain
Politics of Spain
Prime Ministers
Spain
Lists of political office-holders in Spain